Georges Lévis (7 August 1924 in Toulouse – 31 March 1988 in Le Mesnil-Saint-Denis) was a French adult comic artist.

Under the name of Jean Sidobre, he was also the illustrator of the French edition of the Famous Five and other children books.

External links
 Comic creator: Georges Lévis

1924 births
1988 deaths
French comics artists